Ar Rabīatayn is a sub-district of Juban, Yemen of the Dhale Governorate. As of 2004, Ar Rabī‘atayn had a population of 6,978 inhabitants.

Houses 
There are at least 10 houses located within Ar Rabī‘atayn.

References 

Districts of Dhale Governorate